Tommi Virtanen (born March 4, 1989) is a Finnish former ice hockey goaltender. 

Virtanen played one game with TPS of the Finnish SM-liiga during the 2010–11 season.

References

External links

1989 births
Living people
Finnish ice hockey goaltenders
KooKoo players
LHC Les Lions players
EHC Lustenau players
HC TPS players
TuTo players
Sportspeople from Turku